Limes Transalutanus is the modern name given to a fortified frontier system of the Roman Empire, built on the western edge of Teleorman's forests in the Roman province of Dacia, modern-day Romania. The frontier was composed of a road following the border, a military stronghold, a three-metre vallum 10–12 metres wide, reinforced with wood palisades on stone walls, and also a ditch. The Transalutanus limes was 235 km long, parallel to Olt river at a distance varying from 5 to 30 km east of the river. The construction was started in 107 under the command of Marcius Turbo, and developed under Iulius Severus (120–126); the final stage of the construction was performed under Septimius Severus (193–211 d.C.).

Between 244–247, under Philip the Arab, after the Carpian and Getae (or Goths, confusion due to Jordanes) attacks, the Roman Imperial army abandoned the limes for some time. They returned to the limes, but closed the road to the Rucăr-Bran pass, the same starting from the modern village of Băiculeşti.

Later, another limes was built in the area, known as Brazda lui Novac.

Today the vallum is used by the Romanian railroad Curtea de Argeş-Piteşti-Roşiori de Vede-Turnu Măgurele.

See also
Limes (Roman Empire)
Limes Alutanus
Limes Porolissensis
Brazda lui Novac

References

External links
Dorin Bondoc (Repertoriul fortificaţiilor de pe ripa nordică a limesului Dunării de Jos în epoca romană)

Roman Dacia
Roman frontiers
Roman fortifications in Romania
History of Muntenia